The Robinson, later Lynch-Robinson Baronetcy, of Lisnacarrig, Foxrock in the County of Dublin, is a title in the Baronetage of the United Kingdom. It was created on 30 January 1920 for Sir Henry Robinson, KCB, vice-president of the Local Government Board for Ireland from 1898 to 1920. The second Baronet assumed in 1947 by deed poll the additional surname of Lynch.

Robinson, later Lynch-Robinson baronets, of Lisnacarrig (1920)
Sir Henry Augustus Robinson, 1st Baronet (1857–1927)
Sir Christopher Henry Lynch-Robinson, 2nd Baronet (1884–1958)
Sir Niall Bryan Lynch-Robinson, 3rd Baronet DSC (1918–1996)
Sir Dominick Christopher Lynch-Robinson, 4th Baronet (born 1948)
Christopher (Kit) Henry Jake Lynch-Robinson (born 1977) heir apparent

Notes

References
Kidd, Charles, Williamson, David (editors). Debrett's Peerage and Baronetage (1990 edition). New York: St Martin's Press, 1990, 

Lynch-Robinson